Bourreria baccata is a species of plant in the family Boraginaceae. It is native to Caribbean islands including Jamaica, and also to parts of north and South America. Common names include cherry, currant tree, poisonberry, chink, and bodywood.

References

baccata
Near threatened plants
Endemic flora of Jamaica
Taxa named by Constantine Samuel Rafinesque
Taxonomy articles created by Polbot